Gary Charles Schroen (November 6, 1941 – August 1, 2022) was an American intelligence officer who spent 52 years with the Central Intelligence Agency, most notably as a field officer in charge of the initial CIA incursion into Afghanistan in September 2001 to topple the Taliban and destroy Al-Qaeda. He retired as the most decorated CIA officer in history.

Early life
Schroen was born November 6, 1941 in East St. Louis, Illinois to Emil and Fern (née Finch) Schroen. His father was a union electrician, and his mother a homemaker. He joined the Army after graduating from high school in 1959, serving in the Army Security Agency in West Germany for three years. In an incident Schroen called "a bad start" in an unpublished short story, a beer bottle he had left on top of his barracks mailbox spilled on outgoing Christmas correspondence, enraging his commanding officer who threatened to court-martial him for tampering with the U.S. mail. He was reduced in rank to a private instead. 

After receiving an honorable discharge in 1962, Schroen attended Southern Illinois University Edwardsville, working as a janitor and unloading trucks for UPS during college, and graduating with a degree in English in 1968. After graduation he began teaching 5th grade in the Detroit Public Schools. 

In June 1969, Schroen joined the CIA.

Career
Schroen worked in the Directorate of Operations for 52 years, rising from a case officer to deputy chief of the Near East Division in 1999, a post he held through 2001. He spoke fluent Persian and Dari, and became the agency's top expert on Afghanistan. 

Schroen spent much of the 1970's in Iran. As Schroen walked home from the U.S. Embassy in Tehran one night in September 1975, members of the Mujahideen-e Khalq (MEK) attempted to assassinate him in the street, an incident he escaped by pulling a gun on the would-be killers and sprinting away.

On November 21, 1979, Pakistani student protesters who erroneously believed the U.S. was responsible for the Grand Mosque seizure in Mecca, stormed and set fire to the U.S. Embassy in Islamabad, trapping Schroen and others inside. They ultimately found refuge in a code room vault and escaping the compound unharmed before protesters burnt it to the ground. Following his death, widow Anne McFadden would recount to The Washington Post that Schroen often said "If there aren’t 3,000 students coming over the fence, then it’s not an emergency."

Later in his career, Schroen served in numerous posts, including chief of station in Kabul, Afghanistan (but based out of Pakistan) in the late 1980s. From 1992 to 1994, he worked at CIA headquarters in Langley, Virginia, controlling counter-Iran operations. He later served as chief of station in Islamabad, Pakistan from 1996 until mid-1999. During this period, he directed CIA operations to find and capture Osama bin Laden, and began renewing relationships with the Mujahideen commanders who fought the Soviets in the Soviet–Afghan War, including Northern Alliance commander General Ahmad Shah Massoud. He also helped lead a 1997 operation in conjunction with the FBI that captured Mir Aimal Kansi, an FBI Ten Most Wanted Fugitive responsible for the 1993 CIA headquarters shooting.

Although he planned to retire, Schroen was recalled after the September 11 attacks to lead a CIA team into Afghanistan. The seven-officer Northern Alliance Liaison Team (NALT) flew into Afghanistan on September 26 and began securing support among the Northern Alliance, days before the arrival of ODA 555 and ODA 595, each a 12-man A-team from Delta Force and 5th Special Forces Group. He later wrote the book First In: How Seven CIA Officers Opened the War on Terror in Afghanistan (2005) recounting his Afghan experiences. The CIA's review of the book in Studies in Intelligence called it a "mostly straightforward account" of his role which "does a good job getting much of the story out to the American public."

Schroen retired in November 2001 as the most decorated CIA officer in history to date. Following his retirement, he returned to the agency as a contractor. By 2007, he was teaching tradecraft to new officers.

Personal life and death
After two prior marriages to Patricia Ann Healey and Bette Jean Neil ended in divorce, Schroen married Anne McFadden, a fellow CIA officer who spent 35 years with the agency working on Iran, counterproliferation, and counterintelligence, in November 2009. He had three children, two daughters, and a son, Christopher, a Navy linguist and Gulf War veteran who died of cancer in 2017. He also had four stepdaughters, and two granddaughters.

While Al-Shabaab once claimed via Twitter to have killed Schroen in a July 2013 attack, Schroen died at his home in Alexandria, Virginia, on August 1, 2022, at the age of 80, following either a stroke or complications from a fall. Schroen was interred at the columbarium of Grace Episcopal Church in Alexandria, Virginia on September 24, 2022. At the time of his death, CIA director William J. Burns hailed him as a "legend and inspiration to every Agency officer." His death occurred the day after a U.S. drone strike killed Osama bin Laden's successor, Ayman al-Zawahiri, who as Bin Laden's deputy had been one of Schroen's targets. 

Schoen was a noted fan of the Comic Sans font.

In popular culture
Schroen's experiences in Afghanistan prior to September 11 were chronicled in Steve Coll's 2004 Pulitzer Prize-winning book, Ghost Wars.

Schroen was also one of several inspirations for the 2006 two-part miniseries The Path to 9/11 character CIA Operative "Kirk", who writers said was a compilation based on several actual people.

See also
 Gary Berntsen
 Cofer Black
 Operation Cyclone
 Charlie Wilson's War: The Extraordinary Story of the Largest Covert Operation in History
 Charlie Wilson's War (2007 film)

References

Further reading
 Steve Coll, Ghost Wars: The Secret History of the CIA, Afghanistan, and Bin Laden, from the Soviet Invasion to September 10, 2001, Penguin Press (February 2004) .
 Michael Smith, Killer Elite: The Inside Story of America's Most Secret Special Operations Team, St. Martin's Press (August 2011)

External links
 PBS Frontline – The Dark Side: Interview with Gary C. Schroen transcript

1941 births
2022 deaths
21st-century American memoirists
Accidental deaths from falls
Accidental deaths in Virginia
American spies
Military personnel from Illinois
People from East St. Louis, Illinois
People of the Central Intelligence Agency
Southern Illinois University Edwardsville alumni
United States Army soldiers